The Marine Corps Air-Ground Museum was located at Brown Field, Marine Corps Base Quantico, Quantico, Virginia.  It housed a wide variety of historic Marine Corps vehicles/tanks (both wheeled and tracked), equipment, artillery pieces and aircraft (both fixed wing (airplanes) and rotary wing (helicopters)) to trace the evolution and significance of the Marine Air-Ground Team.  It also contained several pieces of foreign equipment, such as a Soviet SU-76M self-propelled howitzer.  The museum closed on November 15, 2002, during the establishment of the National Museum of the Marine Corps.

History
The museum initially opened on May 6, 1978, as the Marine Corps Aviation Museum and eventually became the Marine Corps Air-Ground Museum in the mid-1980s as the collection expanded beyond aviation assets. The museum began in two aircraft hangars and added a third in 1990.

See also
History of the United States Marine Corps
Marine Corps Base Quantico
Marine Corps Museums

Notes

External links

United States Marine Corps Air/Ground Museum.  Information from Aviation Enthusiast Corner website.

Defunct museums in Virginia
Marine Corps museums in the United States
Museums in Prince William County, Virginia
Museums established in 1978
Museums disestablished in 2002